Chukwumerije is a surname. Notable people with the surname include:

Chika Chukwumerije (born 1983), Nigerian taekwondo artist
Dike Chukwumerije, Nigerian poet and author
Uche Chukwumerije (1939–2015), Nigerian politician
 

Surnames of Nigerian origin